Franschhoek (Afrikaans for "French Corner", Dutch spelling before 1947 Fransche Hoek) is a small town in the Western Cape Province and one of the oldest towns in South Africa. Formerly known as Oliphants hoek (as there were vast groups of elephants roaming the valley). It is situated about 75 kilometres from Cape Town, a 45 minute drive away. The whole area including townships such as Groendal and suburbs such as Wemmershoek has a population of slightly over 20,000 people while the town proper, known as Hugenote, has a population of around 1,000. Since 2000, it has been incorporated into Stellenbosch Municipality. Mentioned in Time (magazine) top 50 places in the world to visit for 2022.

History

Franschhoek's original inhabitants are the Khoisan peoples. They are now mostly extinct, but their descendants continue to live in the area as mixed race (Khoisan and French/Dutch) people. In 1685, the French King, Louis XIV, banned Protestantism in France. Hundreds of French Huguenots were forced to flee their country. In 1688, almost 300 French Huguenots arrived at the Cape of Good Hope by ship and they were given the Franschhoek Valley to settle.

The French Huguenot refugees populated the valley establishing farms and businesses bringing with them their French culture and experience in agriculture. The name of the area soon changed to le Coin Français ("the French Corner"), and later to Franschhoek (Dutch for "French Corner"), with many of the settlers naming their new farms after the areas in France from which they came. La Motte, Champagne, La Cotte, Cabrière, La Provence, Bourgogne, La Terra de Luc and La Dauphine were among some of the first established farms — most of which still retain their original Cape Dutch farm houses today. These farms have grown into renowned wineries. Many of the surnames in the area are of French origin, e.g. Du Toit, Marais, Du Plessis, Malan, Malherbe, and Joubert. The French settlers tried fiercely to hold onto their language, but were forced over generations by the Dutch and British colonialists through schooling to integrate into local society.

This heritage is shown today by the Huguenot Monument which stands at the end of the town. The nearby Huguenot Memorial Museum adjacent to the monument explores the history of the French Huguenots who settled in the Cape, and especially in the Franschhoek Valley. On exhibition are the various tools they used to make wine, clothes they wore, and interpretation of their culture and goals. 

The Cape Dutch architecture in much of the village is unspoiled, as restrictions have been placed on the extent of renovations and new construction in order to preserve the spirit of the original French settlers to the area. 

In 1904, a 28km branch line was built between Paarl and Franschhoek to serve as an alternative to ox-drawn carts for farmers wanting to get their produce to market. Steam locomotives operated along the route until diesel locomotives took over in the 1970s and then, in the 1990s, as the need for rail transport decreased, service along the railway line was discontinued. The branch line was reinstated in 2012 by a private operator and now sees service as the Franschhoek Wine Tram, a tourism project utilizing newly constructed double-decker trams modeled after the Blackpool Corporation Tramways Double Deck Balcony Tramcar of circa 1923 to transport tourists between wine estates in the area.

Recent developments
Once a sleepy country retreat, the originally French settled village and region began experiencing a boom in the 1990s, and property prices increased. The ideal summer weather, snowy peaks in winter and proximity to Cape Town have turned Franschhoek (le coin Français) into one of South Africa's most sought after residential addresses. The construction of the new English-medium private Bridge House School outside the village has also attracted many urban dwellers to the village.

Franschhoek is notable for having some of the top restaurants in the country within its borders. This fact, together with the strong wine culture, and pristine natural and architectural beauty has made Franschhoek into what many describe as the "food and wine capital" of South Africa. This village hosted one of the top 50 restaurants in the world 'The Tasting Room', according to the "S.Pellegrino world's 50 best restaurants"-ranking and a famous Belgian Pâtisserie for Belgian pralines.  The town hosts a number of notable restaurants and wineries such as Le Quartier Français and Haute Cabrière.

The attributes of the village have turned Franschhoek into a popular tourist destination, with dozens of bed & breakfasts and small cottages available for accommodation. 
The shopping experience in Franschhoek is known to be very interesting with several independent boutiques, menswear shops and quality homeware stores. 

The art galleries are plentiful and excellent.

Franschhoek's weekend Bastille Festival has been celebrated every July since 1994, the year of the first South African general election with universal adult suffrage marking the end of the apartheid era.

Gallery

Notable residents 
 Pieter Daniel Rossouw (1845 – 1896), pastor and Afrikaans language writer.
 Hendrik Johannes van der Bijl (1887 – 1948), South African electrical engineer and industrialist.
 George Daneel (1904 – 2004), South African rugby player.
 Cecile Cilliers (1933–2018), Afrikaans freelance journalist and writer.
 Vito Roberto Palazzolo (1947), Italian businessman and alleged mafia member.
 Mark Solms (1961), South African psychoanalyst and neuropsychologist.
 Margot Janse (1969), chef. 
 Reuben Riffel (1974), South African celebrity chef, restaurateur and media personality.

See also
Boschendal
Huguenots in South Africa
Dutch Reformed Church, Franschhoek

References

Wine regions of South Africa
Huguenot history in South Africa
French-South African culture
Populated places in the Stellenbosch Local Municipality
Populated places established in 1688
1688 establishments in the Dutch Empire
Populated places established by the Dutch East India Company